Aproaerema simplexella, the soybean moth, is a moth in the family Gelechiidae. It was described by Francis Walker in 1864. It is found in India, China, Australia (Western Australia, the Northern Territory, Queensland, New South Wales, Victoria, Tasmania, South Australia), Norfolk Island and New Zealand. It is an invasive species in Africa, where it has since been recorded from the Democratic Republic of the Congo, Malawi, South Africa and Uganda.

The wingspan is 9–12 mm. The forewings are rather dark bronzy fuscous with an elongate dark fuscous mark on the fold before the middle, sometimes interrupted by a ferruginous-ochreous dot, sometimes followed by some whitish scales. There is sometimes an indistinct dark fuscous discal dot in the middle and a small whitish spot on the tornus, and a larger clear white subtriangular spot on the costa opposite, almost meeting. The hindwings are grey, darker posteriorly.

The larvae feed on Glycine max, Arachis hypogaea, Medicago sativa, Pavonia burchellii, Ipomoea wightii, Ocimum canum, Indigofera hirsute, Desmodium tortuosum and Ipomoea sinensis. They initially feed by skeletonising the leaves, but later instars fold the leaves and web them together. Full-grown larvae reach a length of about 7 mm.

References

Aproaerema
Moths described in 1864
Moths of Africa
Moths of Asia
Moths of Oceania